Paskahousu ("shit pants") is a Finnish card game. The object of the game is to play higher cards than the previously played cards, first to get replacement cards from the stock pile, and, after the stock pile has exhausted, to get rid of one's cards. It is similar to shithead.

Although the basic play is the same across rule variants, the details of the rules vary tremendously. It is practically impossible to find two identical descriptions of the game in the literature. (See the miscellaneous rule variations section below for how the rules vary.) One of the most widespread variants is Valepaska, in which the cards are played face down, and players need not announce their plays truthfully.

Rules 

One deck of 52 cards is used, with aces ranked the highest. The game is played by three to six players, with each initially dealt five cards. The rest of the cards form a face-down stock. In each turn a player places one or more cards of the same rank from his hand into a pile next to the stock according to the following rules:
 If the pile is empty, the player must play cards that are lower than jack. (In some variations of the game, players are allowed to play any card.)
 If the pile is not empty, the new cards must be of the same rank or of a higher rank than the previous cards in the pile.
 Twos can be played on the top of any card or on an empty table. Only another two can be played on top of a two.
 If the top cards of the pile are lower than seven, the player is not allowed to play face cards.
 Aces can be played only on top of face cards or to start an empty pile, but then the next player must pick it up, and the turn passes to the player on the left. Tens can also be played on an empty pile; and as with aces, the next player must pick it up. 

If the player cannot or does not want to play cards according to the previous rules, they must take half the entire pile in hand. If the player has either played 5 cards or taken half the pile, it is not the next player's turn.

If a player plays a ten or an ace, the pile falls. The pile falls also when a player plays cards so that there are four cards of the same rank on top of the pile. When the pile falls, the cards in the pile are discarded from play, and the same player plays the first cards to the now-empty pile. Ten causes a pile with the previous card 3–9 to fall. An ace causes the pile with the previous card J–K. An ace cannot be played on 3–9, and Ten cannot be played on J–K. 

If a player has fewer than five cards in his hand, they must take cards from the stock so that they have five cards (if there are cards left in the stock). 

When a player gets rid of all his cards after the stock has exhausted, they are out and do not participate in the game anymore. The first player to go out is the winner. The loser is the player who has cards left when everyone else has gone out. In some circles the loser is called paskahousu, "shitty pants".

Variants

Valepaska 

In Valepaska (Fake Shit,  Valepaskahousu and Kusetuspaskahousu, and often considered standard Paskahousu in English literature) the cards are played face down, and players announce the cards that they play (for example "one jack" or "three eights"). Players are allowed to lie, and plays may be challenged by any other player. In a challenge, the played cards are exposed: if the play was honest, the challenger must take the pile into his hand (and the challenged player starts the new pile); if the play was deceitful, the challenged player takes the pile (and play passes to the next player). Only the immediately preceding play may be challenged.

According to Finnish website Korttipelit (card games), there are no standard rules for which player continues play following a challenge. The website recommends that an exposed liar never start the new pile.

Pöytäpaska / Espanjalainen paskahousu 

Pöytäpaska (Table Shit) also known as Espanjalainen paskahousu (Spanish Shitpants) In addition to their regular hands, each of the 2–3 players is dealt four face-down cards and four face-up cards. These cards are played after the stock and the cards in the player's hand have been exhausted. The face-up cards are played first. The player can then attempt to play the face-down cards without looking at their rank. If the play is not in accordance with the rules, the player must pick up the entire pile into their hand. These cards in hand must be played before the player can attempt to play another face-down card.

To avoid deadlocks and lengthy games, some rules may be relaxed after the stock is depleted, such as:
rules restricting the play of face cards
rule that the ace falls the pile
rule restricting the play of the ten
rule restricting the play of other cards on a two

Ruotsalainen paskahousu 

In Ruotsalainen paskahousu (Swedish Shitpants) all the cards are dealt, and there is no stock. The game proceeds like the ordinary Paskahousu.

Miscellaneous rule variations 

These rules can be used with the basic game or with any of the variants mentioned above.

Four same cards fall piles 

 Four twos do not cause the pile to fall. (This rule is recommended in particular for Valepaska.)
 Four same cards do not cause the pile to fall. Only aces and tens fall piles.

Face cards 

 Face cards can be only played on the top of eights and higher.
 Face cards can be played on the empty table and on the top of all smaller cards (except for twos.) Aces can be played on the top of the face cards.
 Face cards can be played on the empty table and on the top of all smaller cards (except for twos) after the stock has exhausted.
 Face cards can be played on the empty table and on the top of eights and higher.
 One is allowed to play only one face card per turn.

Aces and tens on an empty table 

 A player is allowed to play an ace on an empty pile, but then the next player must take it and the same player plays again.
 A player is allowed to play an ace on an empty pile, but then the next player must take it, and the turn passes to the player left to him.
 Both tens and aces work like aces in the previous point.

Lack of playable card 

 If a player does not have a suitable card to play, they are allowed to attempt to play the top card from the stock. If this play is not in accordance with the rules, the player must take up the entire pile (including the card they attempted to play) into their hand.

See also 
 Bullshit
 Screw
 Shithead

References 

 Ranta, Pekka, Marjapussissa Porvooseen, WSOY 1993.
 Parlett, David, A-Z of Card Games, Oxford University Press, 2004.
 .
 www.korttipelit.net The rules of Paskahousu (in Finnish).

Finnish card games
Beating games